Græsted is one of the main towns of the Gribskov municipality in the Danish Region Hovedstaden. The town is in northern Sjælland, just south of Gilleleje, and has a population of 3,561 (1 January 2022). The whole of Græsted Parish had 4769 inhabitants (2004).

History
Græsted's original name was Gresholdt, which means a place with grass and forest. Gresholdt is mentioned for the first time in Esrum Klosterbog in 1299. The area then belonged to Holbo Herred.

On 20 January 1880, the railroad between Græsted and Hillerød was inaugurated. This meant that development of the city escalated, with the construction of a post office, supply association, cooperative dairy, cooperative bakery and mill, as well as savings banks and industry. Græsted was for years the leading town in the area.

Græsted is also nicknamed the 'holy town'. This is because the city has historically been characterized by spiritual Awakening since the 1860s. Church life has helped shape the development of the city.

Since the 1960s, the population has doubled to almost 4900. In trade, however, the city has lost much of its significance.

Tourist attractions
Græsted is home to one of the biggest outdoor events for machinery with and without steam in Scandinavia. Græsted Steam Fair.

Famous residents of Græsted

 Aksel C. Wiin-Nielsen (1924–2010) Founder of the European Centre for Medium-Range Weather Forecasts; Director General of the World Meteorological Organization from 1980 to 1984
 Lars Løkke Rasmussen (born 1964) former Prime Minister of Denmark 2015-2019
 Sólrun Løkke Rasmussen (born 1968) city council member for Græsted-Gilleleje from 1998-2005, wife of Lars Løkke Rasmussen

See also
 Holbo Herred

References

External links

Municipality's official website
Din By Græsted

Cities and towns in the Capital Region of Denmark
Former municipalities of Denmark
Gribskov Municipality